These are the names of places currently or previously used by the Geographic Names Information System in Brevard County, Florida. Some are early developments, some are early post offices stations such as Artesia, and others are former stations along the main line of the Florida East Coast Railway. Several of these were absorbed into Kennedy Space Center when it was created. See the main article in Brevard County for place names which are still used.

 Allenhurst 
 Angel City - Newfound Harbor section of Merritt Island, south of SR 520 
 Artesia
 Atlantic
 Audubon
 Aurantia
 Aurora - Turtlemound Rd and Aurora Rd (County)
 Averill
 Bahia
 Ballard Pines
 Banyan (Post Office )
 Bellwood
 Brantley
 Bonaventure - south of Rockledge on U.S. 1
 Bovine - Post Road and Turtlemound Rd. (County)
 Bugsbee - north of Suntree Blvd and U.S. 1, south of Bonaventure
 Canova Beach - Eau Gallie Blvd at SR A1A (Indian Harbour Beach). Named after Irene H. Canova, a longtime resident.
 City Point - About one mile north of 528 on the mainland side of the Indian River. Formerly a ferrying point to Merritt Island.
 Clifton
 Coquina (Post Office )
 Courtenay - Merritt Island
 Delespine - Location of the historic Delespine land Grant given to Joseph Delespine during the Spanish administration, argued before the US Supreme Court
 Dummitt Grove (formerly Dummitt's Grove)
 Eau Gallie
 Evans Pines
 Faustina
 Frontenac
 Georgiana - Merritt Island - South Tropical Trail (CR 3) - former ferry landing to Cocoa
 Goshen - Melbourne - North of Lake Washington Rd and Pineapple Rd
 Grant (Incorporated into the town of Grant-Valkaria)
 Happy Go Lucky (Now launch complex at Cape Canaveral near pad 39A)
 Hardeeville
 Hartland (Post Office )
 Heath
 Hopkins - East end of Union Cypress Railroad
 Horti
 Indianola - Merritt Island - North Tropical Trail
 Indian River City - Titusville
 Jay Jay
 La Grange
 Lotus - Merritt Island - South Tropical Trail (CR 3)
 Melbourne Shores
 Merritt City 
 Mintons Corner - West Melbourne - US 192 and Wickham Rd/Minton Rd
 Mortonhurst (Post Office )
 Nathans
 Oceanus
 Orsino
 Pineda - U.S. 1 at Suntree Blvd (County)
 Pritchards
 Rockwell - Merritt Island - South Tropical Trail (CR 3)
 Sarno
 Sharpes - County Jail
 Sherman Park - South of Palm Shores, Florida on U.S. 1
 Shiloh
 Spyglass
 Suntree - Wickham Rd at Suntree Blvd (County)
 Tillman (Post Office )
 Tropic - South Tropical Trail, Merritt Island
 Turnbull
 Turtle Mound - Northern end of Turtle Mound Rd
 Valkaria (Incorporated into the town of Grant-Valkaria)
 Wiley
 Williams Point
 Wilson

See also
Geographical renaming

References

Geography of Brevard County, Florida
History of Brevard County, Florida
Brevard|Brevard County, Florida